Connor Robinson (born 23 October 1994) is a professional rugby league footballer who plays as a  for the Doncaster R.L.F.C. in the RFL League 1.

He previously played for Hull Kingston Rovers and York City Knights.

Connor Robinson (born 23 October 1994) is a professional rugby league footballer who plays as a scrum-half for the Halifax Panthers in the Betfred Championship.

He previously played for Hull Kingston Rovers and York City Knights.

Playing career

Hull Kingston Rovers
A former West Hull junior, he had been part of Hull Kingston Rovers' youth set-up since the age of 12. Shortly before the 2014 season, he signed a 2-year professional contract.

Halifax RLFC
In July 2015, he was released by Hull Kingston Rovers and joined Halifax.

York City Knights
He was named League 1 player of the season during York's promotion campaign and helped them make the Championship playoffs during their first year back in the division.

Halifax Panthers
On 7 September 2020 it was reported that Robinson would re-join Halifax for the 2021 season

Doncaster R.L.F.C.
On 8 Nov 2021 it was reported that he had signed for Doncaster R.L.F.C. in the RFL League 1

References

1994 births
Living people
Doncaster R.L.F.C. players
English rugby league players
Halifax R.L.F.C. players
Hull Kingston Rovers players
York City Knights players